Niall Dowdall (born 1992 in Clonkill, County Westmeath, Ireland) is an Irish sportsperson.  He plays hurling with his local club Clonkill and has been a member of the Westmeath senior inter-county team since 2011.

References

1992 births
Living people
Clonkill hurlers
Westmeath inter-county hurlers